Strogen may refer to:

 27706 Strogen, main-belt asteroid
 Strogen (river), a river of Bavaria, Germany, tributary of the Sempt